This article lists possible candidates for the Republican nomination for Vice President of the United States in the 2012 election. On May 29, 2012, former Governor Mitt Romney of Massachusetts won the 2012 Republican nomination for President of the United States, and became the presumptive nominee.

On August 11, 2012, Romney officially announced his selection of Wisconsin Representative Paul Ryan as his running-mate to supporters via an iPhone app, though the selection of Ryan had already leaked to the press hours before the official announcement. Ryan was the first individual from Wisconsin to appear on a major party's national ticket, although third-party presidential candidate Robert La Follette won 16% of the popular vote in the 1924 election. The Romney–Ryan ticket ultimately lost in the general election to the Obama–Biden ticket, but the defeat did not harm either of their careers; from 2015 to 2019, Ryan served as Speaker of the United States House of Representatives while Romney, having moved to Utah, has been in the United States Senate since 2019.

Selection process
Romney asked Beth Meyers, an aide, to head up the search team for selecting a vice presidential candidate. It was speculated that Romney might announce his running mate in July to create early enthusiasm and boost fundraising, but this proved untrue. Romney stated that he would select a pro-life vice presidential candidate.

Short list
According to the book Double Down, Romney's campaign narrowed down his list of potential nominees for vice president to eleven individuals in April 2012:

The list was later further narrowed down to five individuals: Christie, Pawlenty, Portman, Rubio, and Ryan. According to Double Down, many on Romney's campaign favored Ryan because he was "young, telegenic, Irish Catholic, with blue collar appeal," and could potentially help the campaign in his competitive home state. Romney also personally liked Ryan and felt comfortable campaigning with him. Christie was also strongly considered, but the vetting process raised several issues.

Media speculation on possible vice presidential candidates
Political analyst Larry Sabato stated that Romney could pick a vice presidential running mate that would help electorally such as by delivering a swing state or a demographic group. Romney's associates suggested the VP pick was likely to be someone mild-mannered with high integrity and have a similar aptitude for analysis. Media speculation and analysis on vice presidential picks included:

Members of Congress

Governors

Other Individuals

The announcement
Having returned from his overseas tour of the United Kingdom, Israel, and Poland, Romney planned a bus tour of Virginia, North Carolina, and Florida with his then-yet to be announced running mate. It was possible that Romney could have chosen to stall his announcement until at least August 12, the last day of the Summer Olympics, in order to attract greater media and voter attention while still allowing time for campaigning and fundraising before the Republican National Convention, which would begin on August 27.

On August 10, 2012, it was announced that Romney would introduce his running mate on August 11, 2012 in Norfolk, Virginia, after touring the USS Wisconsin, leading several news sources to speculate that his choice would be U.S. Representative Paul Ryan of Wisconsin. Shortly after 7 a.m. on August 11, the Romney campaign officially announced Ryan as its choice for vice president through its mobile app titled "Mitt's VP".

See also
Mitt Romney 2012 presidential campaign
2012 Republican Party presidential candidates
2012 Republican Party presidential primaries
2012 Republican National Convention
2012 United States presidential election
List of United States major party presidential tickets

References

External links
The Romney campaign site

Mitt Romney 2012 presidential campaign
Paul Ryan
Vice presidency of the United States
Chris Christie
Marco Rubio
Rand Paul
Political career of Donald Trump
Jeb Bush
Rick Santorum
John Kasich